Shane Ronayne (born 29 September 1979) is a Gaelic football manager whose first senior inter-county management job, since January 2021, was as manager of the Waterford county team, his father's native county. He resigned after eight months, having managed Waterford to an opening round exit from the 2021 Munster SFC against Limerick and a solitary competitive win against Wexford in the NFL's Division 4.

Before taking charge of the Waterford footballers, he led the Tipperary ladies' Gaelic football team to four national titles during four years in charge. Ronayne took over a team playing Division Three league football and intermediate championship, he left the team as it was about to begin a third year in Division One of the National League and a second year of senior championship.

Ronayne began managing in 2005.

Honours

Mourneabbey
All-Ireland Ladies' Club Football Championship: 2018, 2019
Munster Ladies' Senior Club Football Championship: 2014, 2015, 2016, 2017, 2018, 2019
Cork Ladies' Club Football Championship: 2014, 2015, 2016, 2017, 2018, 2019

Tipperary
All-Ireland Intermediate Ladies' Football Championship: 2017, 2019

References

1979 births
Living people
Gaelic football managers
Irish schoolteachers
Ladies' Gaelic football managers